Lena Maria Hawkins (born 5 May 1962) is a road cyclist from Canada. She represented her nation at the 1992 Summer Olympics in the women's road race.

References

External links
 profile at sports-reference.com

Canadian female cyclists
Cyclists at the 1992 Summer Olympics
Olympic cyclists of Canada
Living people
People from Wroughton
1962 births
20th-century Canadian women
21st-century Canadian women